Chhota Udaipur Lok Sabha constituency is one or the 26 Lok Sabha (parliamentary) constituencies in Gujarat state in western India.This seat is dominated by tribal and is reserved for Scheduled Tribes.

Assembly segments
Presently, Chhota Udaipur  Lok Sabha constituency comprises seven Vidhan Sabha (legislative assembly) segments. These are:

Members of Parliament

Election Results

General elections 2004

General Elections 2009

General Election 2014

General Election 2019

See also
 Vadodara district
 List of Constituencies of the Lok Sabha

Notes

Lok Sabha constituencies in Gujarat
Vadodara district